Totex Corporation is a Japanese manufacturer of meteorological balloons. The company began production of balloons in 1937.

They currently produce three types of balloons:
TA is a rubber/latex balloon and was developed in 1940.
CR is a chloroprene balloon and was developed in 1966.
TX is a latex balloon and was developed in 1988.

The TX balloon is the standard used by Environment Canada in their Upper Air program (see Radiosonde).

References

External links
Totex Corporation

Manufacturing companies of Japan